The women's 220–110–220–110 yards relay event at the 1950 British Empire Games was held on 11 February at the Eden Park in Auckland, New Zealand. It was the last time this relay was contested at the Games, later being replaced with the 4 × 440 yards relay.

Results

References

Athletics at the 1950 British Empire Games
1950